Tianhe Sports Center Station is a station on Line 1 of the Guangzhou Metro that started operations on 28June 1999. It is situated under Tiyu East Road next to the Tianhe Sports Center in the Tianhe District, near Guangzhou Computer Town.

Station layout

Exits

References

Railway stations in China opened in 1999
Guangzhou Metro stations in Tianhe District